Marc Sarreau (born 10 June 1993 in Vierzon) is a French cyclist, who currently rides for UCI WorldTeam . He was named in the start list for the 2016 Giro d'Italia.

Major results

2013
 7th Grand Prix de la ville de Nogent-sur-Oise
2014
 1st  Overall Tour du Canton de Saint-Ciers
1st Stage 1
 1st Boucles du Haut Var
 1st Paris–Chauny
 1st Stage 2 Tour Nivernais Morvan
 1st Stage 2 Tour de Seine Maritime
 3rd ZLM Tour
 6th Overall Ronde de l'Oise
2015
 1st Stage 3 Tour du Poitou-Charentes
 4th Scheldeprijs
 7th Grand Prix d'Isbergues
 10th Grand Prix de Fourmies
2016
 1st Stage 1 (TTT) La Méditerranéenne
 4th Paris–Bourges
 5th Cholet-Pays de Loire
 9th Trofeo Felanitx-Ses Salines–Campos-Porreres
 10th Trofeo Playa de Palma
2017
 1st Stage 5 Tour du Poitou-Charentes
 2nd Grand Prix de Fourmies
 2nd Paris–Bourges
 8th Scheldeprijs
 9th Grand Prix d'Isbergues
2018
 1st La Roue Tourangelle
 Circuit de la Sarthe
1st  Points classification
1st Stage 2
 1st Stage 1 Four Days of Dunkirk
 8th Grand Prix de Denain
 9th Overall Étoile de Bessèges
1st  Points classification
1st Stages 1 & 3
2019
 1st Overall French Road Cycling Cup
 1st Paris–Bourges
 1st Tour de Vendée
 1st Cholet-Pays de la Loire
 1st Route Adélie
 1st  Points classification Tour de Pologne
 1st Stage 3 Étoile de Bessèges
 2nd Grand Prix de Denain
 2nd Classic Loire Atlantique
 3rd La Roue Tourangelle
 6th Tro-Bro Léon
2020
 6th Race Torquay
2021
 2nd Circuit de Wallonie
 3rd La Roue Tourangelle
 5th Cholet-Pays de la Loire
 9th Scheldeprijs
 9th Clásica de Almería
 10th Overall Boucles de la Mayenne
2022
 1st Cholet-Pays de la Loire
 Tour Poitou-Charentes en Nouvelle-Aquitaine
1st  Points classification
1st Stages 1, 2 & 3a
 2nd Grand Prix d'Isbergues
 5th Grand Prix de Denain
 6th Paris–Chauny
 8th Grand Prix de Fourmies
 10th Paris–Bourges

Grand Tour general classification results timeline

References

External links

 
 
 

1993 births
Living people
French male cyclists
European Games competitors for France
Cyclists at the 2019 European Games
Sportspeople from Cher (department)
Cyclists from Centre-Val de Loire
People from Vierzon